The Corner Inlet Marine National Park is a protected marine national park located in the South Gippsland region of Victoria, Australia.

The park is located adjacent to the Wilsons Promontory National Park and integrally linked to Corner Inlet Marine and Coastal Park and forms part of an area that has been recognised as a wetland of international significance under the Ramsar Convention.

See also

 Protected areas of Victoria
 Granite Island (Victoria), part of the boundary of the northern section of the park
 Bennison Island, part of the boundary of the southern section of the park

References

External links

Ramsar sites in Australia
Marine parks in Victoria (Australia)
Gippsland (region)
Coastline of Victoria (Australia)